The Czech Ice Hockey Association is the governing body of ice hockey in the Czech Republic.

Structure
According to the statutes, seven organs operate in the Czech Ice Hockey Association. Every two years, he meets as the supreme body of the conference, which is once every four years in the election. Among the conferences, ČSLH conducts an eleven-member executive committee headed by the president of the association. Within the ČSLH there are various specialized committees, which are now 13 (arbitration, disciplinary, conciliation, judges, goalkeepers, veterans, youth, women's hockey, sports, medical, economic, marketing, coaching). Permanent body among conferences is also the Supervisory Board. Members of the association may be, in addition to clubs, natural persons. Hockey clubs are grouped together in 14 regions of the Czech Republic. The statutes of CSLH further assume the existence of district executive committees.

ČSLH is also the founder of PRO-HOCKEY Cz, a subsidiary of the company, which owns marketing and television rights related to Czech ice hockey representations (including junior).

From hockey competitions ČSLH organizes at central level I and II. Men's league, women's league and extraliga (leagues) for pupils, teenagers and juniors. On the regional level, regional assemblies of regional agendas (such as the Regional Hockey League) are organized by the regional unions.

The Czech Ice Hockey Association currently brings together around 100,000 registered players, of which around 75,000 in the men's category and around 23,000 in the junior category. About 2000 women are registered. There are 81 playgrounds in the country.

National team logos from different times

History

Origin and time before the First World War
The association was formed on the initiative of Slavie Praha functionary Emil Procházka, who sent the application to the just-emerging LIHG on November 15, 1908, although the constituent general assembly of the Czech Hockey League took place on December 11. The General Meetings were attended by delegates from 12 sports clubs. However, there were immediately disputes between representatives of Slavia and Sparta Prague, and the General Meeting had to repeat it three times. The first chairman of the Union became Jaroslav Potůček from BZK Prague for more than a few days until January 13, 1909. The union subsequently decided to send a representative team, whose players were later named hockey musketeers, to an international tournament in Chamonix, France.

The union did not use money and the spread of ice hockey (called to differentiate itself from the Canadian hockey band) helped at least by the fact that its officials published articles in various magazines. Particularly active was the representative of the Czech Union in the LIHG and the goalkeeper of the ice hockey musketeers Josef Gruss and interesting ideas were presented in the press also the shooter of the first Czech goalkeeping goal, Jan Palouš. After the success of the 1911 European Ice Hockey Championship, the association managed to win the next championship. This was later canceled because the Austrian Hockey League was not a member of the LIHG at the time of its conduct, and the indiscriminate match of the Czech hockey players with the Germans did not repeat despite the protests of the rival. The then president of the Czech Union Procházka resigned in response to this decision.

Before the First World War, the Czech Union alternated about two dozen clubs, but they had to organize the tournaments themselves. The association has been more focused on safeguarding positions on the international scene. Unlike football, the Hockey League has succeeded in defending membership of the LIHG on the national principle instead of the state throughout this critical period.

Between the two world wars
After the establishment of Czechoslovakia, the Czechoslovak Hockey Association (CSSH) was established in 1919 as an organization under which, in addition to ice hockey, the bands and ground hockey also fell. Ice hockey was run by about a third of 25 member clubs. Following the success of the ice hockey team in the 1920 ice hockey tournament, the Ice Hockey Section, under the chairmanship of the successful representative of Jan Fleischmann in 1921, was named the Czechoslovak Canadian Hockey Association (CSSKH).

In the last month of 1923, the union split, when the Czechoslovak Association of Canadian Hockey (ČSAKH) separated from it under the leadership of Karel Hartmann of Sparta. The calm of the situation did not contribute to the fact that in January of the following year a union championship was held, which was the first time to fight for the trophy cup donated by the president T. Masaryk. The disputes also affected the nomination for the ice hockey tournament of the 1924 Winter Olympics, despite the fact that the Czechoslovak Sporting Village tried to prevent it. Of the clubs that leaned toward the ČSAKH, only Maleček, who received a soldier of the attendance service, attended an order from the Ministry of Defense. The unification of the Union took place after a year, mainly under the influence of the European Ice Hockey Championship 1925.

Domestic championship decorated with gold medals has greatly helped the Union to promote ice hockey at the expense of the band in Slovakia, where it took place after some peripetials. In 1927, the union brought together twice the number of clubs to the state after the First World War, but this did not match the number of registered players. So registration was declared a necessary condition for each player to take part in a match. In the following year, ice and ground hockey structures were separated. At the same time, the problem of the parallel existence of the associations of national minorities on the territory of Czechoslovakia began to be solved. German clubs associated with Deutscher EisHockey Verband (DEHV) threatened international boycott from LIHG, but the situation has improved rapidly. In January 1929, for example, a match was played between the teams of Prague and Opava, where the best hockey players of German origin were in the Czechoslovak territory. At the 1929 European ice hockey championship, four Opava players went out with the Czechoslovak representation team, with another title largely deserving of key goals in two extensions in the decisive games Wolfgang Dorasil.

After a successful championship, the union also had the final promise of building a winter stadium with the first artificial ice in Czechoslovakia. The construction of the stadium in Štvanice in Prague has faced a number of problems. These, among other things, made it impossible for the European Ice Hockey Championship 1932 to be held in Prague. In the fall of 1931, the Czechoslovak League of Canadian Hockey (ČSLKH) was established, which merged clubs from the Czechoslovak and German associations. Jaromir Citta was the chairman of the then Czechoslovak club, LTC Praha, for the last five years. His work has also begun by the Corps of Judges, who associated the judges as other important participants in each hockey match. On November 6, 1932, the official and permanent opening of the winter stadium in Štvanice took place. A quarter of a year later, the Ice Hockey World Championship took place in 1933, when Czechoslovak hockey players won another title of European Champion.

While the number of hockey clubs distributed was around 15, the number of hockey clubs under ČSLKH and registered ice hockey players increased until 1938. At that time, Hungarian hockey clubs operating in the Czechoslovak territory were also involved in ČSLKH. Overall, ČSLKH held in 1938 with 361 member clubs a remarkable European primacy. This was due to the organization of the World Championships and the involvement of Canadian hockey players, especially by Prague clubs. Both of these facts could have led to the popularity of ice hockey popularity among the public. Among the Canadian players, Mike Buckn contributed most to the formation of Czechoslovak Ice Hockey, and at the World Ice Hockey World Championship in 1938 he worked in the home team on the home team. The association has managed to establish and complete at least two years of the National Leagues as a new national ice hockey club competition under these favorable conditions. This was in the conditions when the only permanent artificial ice area in Czechoslovakia was a great success.

Criticism
The Czech Ice Hockey League faces long-standing criticism of the table values of players, which are compared to modern slavery. One of the biggest critics of the League is the Players Association. Meanwhile, the first known hockey player to contract out of so many criticized tabloids is Adam Jehlička.

References

External links
 Official website

Ice hockey in the Czech Republic
International Ice Hockey Federation members
Ice hockey governing bodies in Europe
Ice